Jordan Membrey (born 1 January 1996) is an Australian rules footballer who plays for the Gold Coast. She has also played for Brisbane and Collingwood in the AFL Women's.

Early life
Membrey was born in Carlton, Victoria in 1996 and moved with her family to the Gold Coast at the age of 8. Her initial sporting interests included netball and touch rugby, but later took up Australian rules football for the first time at the age of 15 with the Carrara Saints in the local Gold Coast competition. She transitioned to the Coolangatta-Tweed Heads Bluebirds and was drafted by the Brisbane Lions in 2016. She attended Trinity College throughout her upbringing.

AFLW career
Membrey was recruited by Brisbane as a free agent before the 2017 season. She made her debut in the Lions' round 4 game against Greater Western Sydney at the South Pine Sports Complex on 25 February 2017.

Membrey was delisted by Brisbane at the end of the 2017 season.

She would then get a second chance in the AFLW after Collingwood drafted Membrey with the 51st pick in the 2018 AFL Women's draft. At the end of the season, she was delisted by Collingwood.

After a season with Hawthorn in the VFL Women's, Collingwood re-drafted Membrey with the 74th pick of the 2019 AFL Women's draft.

In March 2023, Membrey was part of a five club trade, which involved her returning home to Queensland and joining the Gold Coast, while Collingwood received pick #14.

Statistics
Statistics are correct to the end of the S7 (2022) season.

|- 
! scope="row" style="text-align:center" | 2017
|style="text-align:center;"|
| 27 || 5 || 1 || 0 || 8 || 8 || 16 || 3 || 8 || 0.2 || 0.0 || 1.6 || 1.6 || 3.2 || 0.6 || 1.6
|- 
! scope="row" style="text-align:center" | 2019
|style="text-align:center;"|
| 31 || 3 || 2 || 0 || 6 || 6 || 12 || 7 || 6 || 0.7 || 0.0 || 2.0 || 2.0 || 4.0 || 2.3 || 2.0
|- 
! scope="row" style="text-align:center" | 2020
|style="text-align:center;"|
| 21 || 7 || 7 || 0 || 38 || 19 || 57 || 19 || 19 || 1.0 || 0.0 || 5.4 || 2.7 || 8.1 || 2.7 || 2.7
|- 
! scope="row" style="text-align:center" | 2021
|style="text-align:center;"|
| 21 || 3 || 1 || 0 || 11 || 6 || 17 || 8 || 2 || 0.3 || 0.0 || 3.7 || 2.0 || 5.7 || 2.7 || 0.7
|- 
! scope="row" style="text-align:center" | 2022
|style="text-align:center;"|
| 21 || 0 || — || — || — || — || — || — || — || — || — || — || — || — || — || —
|- 
! scope="row" style="text-align:center" | S7 (2022)
|style="text-align:center;"|
| 21 || 10 || 3 || 3 || 30 || 24 || 54 || 18 || 32 || 0.3 || 0.3 || 3.0 || 2.4 || 5.4 || 1.8 || 3.2
|- class="sortbottom"
! colspan=3| Career
! 28
! 14
! 3
! 93
! 63
! 156
! 55
! 67
! 0.5
! 0.1
! 3.3
! 2.3
! 5.6
! 2.0
! 2.4
|}

References

External links

1996 births
Living people
Sportspeople from the Gold Coast, Queensland
Sportswomen from Queensland
Australian rules footballers from Queensland
Brisbane Lions (AFLW) players
Collingwood Football Club (AFLW) players